The 2012 Campeonato Internacional de Tenis de Santos was a professional tennis tournament played on clay courts. It was the second edition of the tournament which was part of the 2012 ATP Challenger Tour. It took place in Santos, Brazil between 16 and 22 April 2012.

Singles main draw entrants

Seeds

 1 Rankings are as of April 9, 2012.

Other entrants
The following players received wildcards into the singles main draw:
  Enrique Bogo
  Felipe Soares
  João Pedro Sorgi
  João Souza

The following players received entry from the qualifying draw:
  Guido Andreozzi
  Damir Džumhur
  Ricardo Hocevar
  Marco Trungelliti

Champions

Singles

 Ivo Minář def.  Ricardo Hocevar, 4–6, 6–1, 6–4

Doubles

 Andrés Molteni /  Marco Trungelliti def.  Rogério Dutra da Silva /  Júlio Silva, 6–4, 6–3

External links
Official Website
ITF Search
ATP official site

Campeonato Internacional de Tenis de Santos
Santos Brasil Tennis Open